The Kurpark Bad Bellingen (24.3 hectares) is a nature park and botanical garden located on the Badstraße, Bad Bellingen, Baden-Württemberg, Germany. Its natural area covers 11.3 hectares; the park and garden covers 10.8 hectares, and includes green spaces as well as yearly plantings of tens of thousands of spring and summer flowers.

See also 
 List of botanical gardens in Germany

External links 
 Kurpark Bad Bellingen
 BGCI entry

Bad Bellingen, Kurpark
Bad Bellingen, Kurpark
Lörrach (district)